"Broken" is the debut single by Australian singer, Sam Clark's debut album,  Take Me Home. The song was written and produced by Paul Wiltshire and was released digitally on 13 November 2009  and physically on 19 November

Charts 
Despite "Broken" being released in 2009, it debuted on the ARIA Singles Chart at number fifty on 24 January 2010 A week later, it moved up to number thirty nine However, the single had made a better impact on other Australian charts including the Australian Singles Chart (chart only for Australian origin), where it peaked at number eleven and the Australian Physical Singles Chart, where it peaked at number one The single also did well on the AIR Singles Chart (Australian Independent Charts), where it peaked at number four

Track listing

Release history

References 

2009 singles
Sam Clark songs
2009 songs
Songs written by Paul Wiltshire